The 2011 UCI Road World Championships took place in Copenhagen, Denmark, over 19–25 September 2011. The event consisted of a cycling road race and a time trial for men, women, men under 23, and for the first time since 2004 the junior men and junior women competed at the same event as the elite riders. It was the 78th running of the Road World Championships. Castelfidardo near Loreto in Italy was also a candidate, but Italy held the UCI Road World Championships in Varese in 2008. It was the first time that Denmark has hosted the event since 1956, when it was also held in Copenhagen.

Schedule
19 September
10h00-11h45 Time trial Junior Women, 13,9 km
13h00-17h30 Time trial Under 23 Men, 35,2 km (2x17,6 km)
20 September
09h30-13h15 Time trial Junior Men, 27,8 km (2x13,9 km)
14h00-17h10 Time trial Elite Women, 27,8 km (2x13,9 km)
21 September
12h30-17h05 Time trial Elite Men, 46,4 km (2x23,2 km)
23 September
09h30-11h55 Road race Junior Women, 70 km (5 x 14 km)
13h00-17h15 Road race Under 23 Men, 168 km (12 x 14 km)
24 September
09h00-12h30 Road race Junior Men, 126 km (9 x 14 km)
13h30-17h15 Road race Elite Women, 140 km (10 x 14 km)
25 September
10h00-17h05 Road race Elite Men, 266 km (17 x 14 km + 28 km, from start in Copenhagen town center)

Courses
Time Trial Course
Road Race Course

Participating nations
Cyclists from 71 national federations participated. The number of cyclists per nation that competed is shown in parentheses.

Events summary

Medal table

References

External links

Official Organizing Committee website 

 
UCI Road World Championships by year
W
UCI
International cycle races hosted by Denmark